Elly Lieber (7 October 1932 in Aussee – 1 August 2020 in Bad Aussee) was an Austrian luger who competed in the late 1950s. She won the gold medal in the women's singles event at the 1959 FIL World Luge Championships in Villard-de-Lans, France.

Lieber also won a gold medal in the women's singles event at the 1956 European luge championships in Imst, Austria.

References

List of European luge champions 

1932 births
2020 deaths
Austrian female lugers
People from Liezen District
Sportspeople from Styria
20th-century Austrian women
21st-century Austrian women